Jack Bosden (born 17 January 1989) is an Australian former professional rugby league footballer who played in the 2010s. He played in the National Rugby League as a front- or second-row forward for the St. George Illawarra Dragons and Sydney Roosters.

Born in Sydney, Bosden was originally a Cronulla-Caringbah junior. He made his National Rugby League debut for the St George-Illawarra Dragons in round 9 of the 2011 NRL season.

After initially being touted as following coach Wayne Bennett to the Newcastle Knights at the end of the 2011 season he eventually signed a two-year contract commencing in 2012 with the Sydney Roosters.

Bosden later played for the Western Suburbs Red Devils.

References

1989 births
Rugby league players from Sydney
Australian rugby league players
Sydney Roosters players
St. George Illawarra Dragons players
Rugby league props
Rugby league second-rows
Rugby league locks
Living people